Roger Honyton, of Goudhurst, Kent and Little Horsted, Sussex, was an English politician.

Family
Honyton was married three times. Before June 1407, he married Joan, daughter and coheiress of John Mayhew of Ashford, Kent. He married again, before November 1423, a woman named Alice. They had two sons. His third wife was named Joan.

Career
Honyton was a Member of Parliament for Kent constituency in December 1421.

References

Year of birth missing
Year of death missing
English MPs December 1421
15th-century deaths
People from Goudhurst
People from Little Horsted